Marceline Loridan-Ivens (née Rozenberg; 19 March 1928 – 18 September 2018) was a French writer and film director. Her memoir But You Did Not Come Back details her time in Auschwitz-Birkenau. She was married to Joris Ivens.

Biography
Marceline Rozenberg was born to Polish Jewish parents who emigrated to France since 1919. At the beginning of World War II, her family settled in Vaucluse, where she joined the French Resistance. She and her father, Szlama, were captured by the Gestapo and deported to Auschwitz-Birkenau by Convoy 71 on 13 April 1944, along with Simone Veil and Anne-Lise Stern, then to Bergen-Belsen, and eventually to Theresienstadt. The camp was liberated on 10 May 1945. by the Red Army.

She married  Francis Loridan, an engineer. Years later they divorced, but she was allowed to keep his surname.

She joined the French Communist Party in 1955 and left it a year later. She then encountered "deviationists", such as Henri Lefebvre and Edgar Morin, wrote manuscripts for intellectuals, worked in the reprographic service of a polling institute, was bag carrier for the Algerian National Liberation Front and frequented Saint-Germain-des-Prés

In 1961, Edgar Morin cast her in the film Chronique d'un été, thus making her film debut. In 1963, she met and married the documentary director Joris Ivens. She assisted him in his work and co-directed some of his films, including 17th Parallel: Vietnam in War  (1968). They left together for Vietnam, where they met Ho Chi Minh.

From 1972 to 1976, during the Cultural Revolution, Joris Ivens and Marceline Loridan worked in China and directed How Yukong Moved the Mountains, a series of 12 films Criticized by Jiang Qing, they had to quickly leave China.

Loridan-Ivens gave lectures and testimonies in colleges and high schools on the Holocaust.

Partial filmography

As director 
 1962: Algérie, année zéro – Documentary co-directed with Jean-Pierre Sergent
 1968: 17th Parallel: Vietnam in War – Documentary co-directed with Joris Ivens
 1976: How Yukong Moved the Mountains – Documentary series co-directed with Joris Ivens
 1976: Une histoire de ballon, lycée n° 31 Pékin – Short film (19 min) co-directed with Joris Ivens
 1977: Les Kazaks – Documentary co-directed with Joris Ivens
 1977: Les Ouigours – Documentary co-directed with Joris Ivens
 1988: A Tale of the Wind – Documentary-fiction co-directed with Joris Ivens
 2003: La Petite Prairie aux bouleaux

As actress 
 1961: Chronique d'un été
 1999: Peut-être
 2008: Une belle croisière
 2008: Les Bureaux de Dieu
 2013: Bright Days Ahead

Screenwriter 
 2003: La Petite Prairie aux bouleaux

Awards and nominations 
 1977: Cesar Award for Best Documentary Short for Une histoire de ballon, lycée n° 31 Pékin
 2015: Lilac Academy Award
 2015: Jean-Jacques-Rousseau Prize for Et tu n'es pas revenu (Grasset)
2016: National Jewish Book Award for But You Did Not Come Back: A Memoir

Publications 
 17e parallèle : la guerre du peuple: deux mois sous la terre, cowritten with Joris Ivens, Paris, les Éditeurs français réunis, 1969 (44 illustrations)
 Ma vie balagan, story written with journalist Élisabeth D. Inandiak, Robert Laffont, 2008 
Et tu n'es pas revenu, story written with Judith Perrignon, Grasset, 2015 
 L'amour après, story written with Judith Perrignon, Grasset, 2018, 162 p.

References

Sources 
 Serge Klarsfeld, Le Mémorial de la Déportation des Juifs de France, Beate and Serge Klarsfeld, 1978; New Edition: Association des Fils et Filles des Déportés Juifs de France (FFDJF), 2012

External links 
 
 «À réécouter, les propos chocs de Marceline Loridan, ancienne déportée» at France Inter, 27 January 2015.

1928 births
2018 deaths
Auschwitz concentration camp survivors
Burials at Montparnasse Cemetery
Commandeurs of the Ordre des Arts et des Lettres
French Communist Party members
French women film directors
French women writers
People from Épinal
Signatories of the 1971 Manifesto of the 343